The 2020–21 Iranian Women Football League was the 13th season of the Iran Women League. Shahrdari Bam were the defending champions. The season featured 11 teams divided into two groups of 5 and 6 teams for regular season. Shahrdari Sirjan won the league for the second time and ended three consecutive winnings of Shahrdari Bam.

Format 
Due to COVID-19 pandemic in Iran the format of the league changed from normal round-robin in previous seasons to new format: 11 teams divided into two groups of 5 and 6 teams. In each group, teams played against each other in two home and away matches. After the end of these matches in both groups, winners and runners-up of each group (total 4 teams) qualified to final stage and the lowest ranked team in each group (total 2 teams) relegated to Women 1st Division. In final stage, four teams played against each other in a round-robin home-and-away format in 6 weeks.

Regular season

Group 1 
</noinclude> Group 2  Final Round <noinclude>

References

External links 

 Iranian Futsal Footba11 

Women's football in Iran